A cat house is a cattery, a place where cats are housed.

Cat house may also refer to:

Places

 Cat house (Kiev), a building in Kiev, Ukraine
 Cat house (Riga), a building in Riga, Latvia
 The Cat House, a house in Henfield, England
 The Cat House on the Kings, a cat sanctuary in California, United States

In fiction
 "Cat House" (Charmed), an episode of the television series Charmed
 Cathouse: The Series, a television series documenting a brothel

Other uses
 Cat House radar, Soviet radar system
 An American slang word for a brothel

See also 
Cathouse (disambiguation)
Cat condo, a piece of cat furniture